Memoirs of a Film Actress is a 1921 German silent film directed by Frederic Zelnik and starring Lya Mara, Ernst Hofmann and Wilhelm Diegelmann. It premiered at the Marmorhaus in Berlin.

The film's sets were designed by the art director Fritz Lederer.

Cast
Lya Mara
Ernst Hofmann
Wilhelm Diegelmann
Ilka Grüning
Richard Georg
Charles Puffy
Hermann Picha
Fritz Schulz
Paul Westermeier

References

External links

Films of the Weimar Republic
German silent feature films
Films directed by Frederic Zelnik
German black-and-white films
1920s German films